Music for Them Asses is the first and only album released by the heavy metal band The Almighty Punchdrunk featuring Gene Hoglan of Strapping Young Lad and Cam Kroetsch of Savannah. The album was produced by Devin Townsend in 2001 and was never released commercially; it is only available from Hevy Devy Records' eBay store and HevyDevy.com.

Track listing
Egypt 
Potes
Tug the Tapeworm
The Show 
TSM I
TSM II 
Rotter
Stinkfoot 
Reject Radio 
Nick
Rancho Relaxo 
Fouled Out 
Hard Day 
Warbird 
Buxxom
Sketchy la Rue

Personnel
 Glenn Thomson - vocals
 Cam Kroetsch - guitars, backing vocals
 Shane Clark - guitars
 Ron MacNeil - bass
 Gene Hoglan - drums

External links
HevyDevy Main Page

2001 albums
Albums produced by Devin Townsend